Sabine Contini (born January 22, 1970) is an Italian former competitive figure skater. She is the 1988 Prague Skate silver medalist, 1989 Grand Prix International St. Gervais bronze medalist, and 1989 Italian national champion. She reached the free skate at three ISU Championships – 1989 Europeans in Birmingham, England; 1990 Worlds in Halifax, Nova Scotia, Canada; and 1991 Europeans in Sofia, Bulgaria.

Competitive highlights

References 

Italian female single skaters
Living people
20th-century Italian women
21st-century Italian women
1970 births